Millington is a NJ Transit station in the Millington section of Long Hill Township in Morris County, New Jersey, United States, located at the intersection of Oaks Road and Division Avenue. It is served by the Gladstone Branch of the Morris and Essex Lines, and is one of three stops in Long Hill Township.

History 
This station opened on January 29, 1872. The station building of stone-masonry construction was built in 1901 by the Delaware, Lackawanna and Western Railroad and houses the Millington Station Cafe.  In 1984, it was listed in the New Jersey Register of Historic Places and National Register of Historic Places as part of the Operating Passenger Railroad Stations Thematic Resource.

Station facilities and layout

The station has one low-level asphalt side platform that is not accessible under the Americans with Disabilities Act of 1990. No buses serve the station, which does not have a station shelter except for the canopy. A 114-space parking lot owned by Long Hill Township is located south of the station. The spaces are permit-only on weekdays and evenings and are free on weekends. The station also has a single ticket machine and bicycle racks.

See also
List of New Jersey Transit stations
National Register of Historic Places listings in Morris County, New Jersey

References

External links

Long Hill Township, New Jersey
NJ Transit Rail Operations stations
Railway stations in the United States opened in 1872
Railway stations on the National Register of Historic Places in New Jersey
Former Delaware, Lackawanna and Western Railroad stations
Railway stations in Morris County, New Jersey
National Register of Historic Places in Morris County, New Jersey
New Jersey Register of Historic Places
1872 establishments in New Jersey